The Tucson mayoral election of 1991 occurred on November 5, 1991 to elect the mayor of Tucson, and occurred coinciding with the elections to the Tucson City Council wards 1, 2 and 4. It saw the election of George Miller.

Incumbent mayor Thomas Volgy did not seek reelection.

Nominations
Primaries were held for the Democratic, Libertarian, and Republican parties on September 7, 1999.

Democratic primary

Libertarian primary

Republican primary

General election

References

Mayoral elections in Tucson, Arizona
Tucson
Tucson